The following is a timeline of the history of the city of Amman, Kingdom of Jordan.

Prior to 20th century

 7250 BCE - 'Ain Ghazal Neolithic settlement was built spanning over an area of 15 hectares.
 800 BCE - Amman Citadel Inscription
 2nd century CE - Roman theatre and Nymphaeum built (approximate date).
 3rd century CE - Rujm Al-Malfouf (tower) in use.
 8th century - Al-Masjid al-Umawi (mosque) and Al-Qasr Umawi (palace) built.
 1879 - Population: 150. English traveller Laurence Oliphant wrote of a visit in 1879 in his The Land of Gilead, suggesting that the area was uninhabited prior to the arrival of the Circassians. 
 1890 - Population: 1,000.

20th century
 1908 - Hejaz Railway in operation.
 1909
 Municipal council formed.
 Population: 2,000 (approximate).
 1918
 March: First Battle of Amman.
 25 September: Second Battle of Amman.
 1923 -  built.
 1926 - Raghadan Palace built.
 1928 - Amman becomes capital of the Emirate of Transjordan.
 1932 - Al-Faisaly Football Club formed.
 1938 - National electricity company founded.
 1946 - City becomes capital of the Hashemite Kingdom of Jordan.
 1947 - Population: 33,110.
 1948 - Palestinian population expands.
 1949 - Cornerstone of Church of the Redeemer, Amman is laid.
 1951 - Jordan Archaeological Museum established.
 1952 - Population: 103,304.
 1956 - Al-Wehdat Sports Club formed.
 1958 - Amman Surgical Hospital built.
 1961
 Abu Darweesh Mosque built.
 Population: 246,475.
 1962 - University of Jordan established.
 1963 - Amman International Stadium opens.
 1966 - Population: 330,000.
 1967
 Palestinian war refugee population expands.
 Ad-Dustour newspaper begins publication.
 1970 - September: Conflict begins between Jordanian Armed Forces and Palestine Liberation Organisation.
 1974 - Population: 598,000 (approximate).
 1975 - The Jordan Times newspaper begins publication.
 1981 - Jordan Rally (automotive race) begins.
 1983 - Queen Alia International Airport built.
 1985 - Population: 812,500 (estimate).
 1989
 Ali Suheimat becomes mayor.
 King Abdullah I Mosque and Kan Zaman Tourist Village constructed.
 1991 - Palestinian war refugee population expands.
 1993 - Jordan Hospital and Jubilee School established.
 1994 - Arab Medical Center in business.
 1997 - Amanat 'Amman al-Kubra (city hall) built.
 1998 - King Abdullah Stadium opens.
 1999 - Amman Stock Exchange founded.
 2000 - Al-Hussein Cultural Center inaugurated.

21st century

 2001 - Jordan Media City established.
 2002
 Broadcasting of Arab Radio and Television Network relocated to Amman.
 City designated an Arab Capital of Culture.
 2003
 Alghad newspaper begins publication.
 Iraqi war refugee population expands.
 Mecca Mall opens.
 Le Royal Hotel built.
 Raghadan Flagpole in use.
 2004 - Al Ghad newspaper begins publication.
 2005
 Souk Jara begins in Jabal Amman.
 9 November: Hotel bombings.
 2006
 Omar Maani becomes mayor.
 Abdoun Bridge and King Hussein Ben Talal Mosque built.
 City Mall opens.
 2007 - Children's Museum established.
 2008
 Amman Stand-up Comedy Festival begins.
 Rainbow Street renovated.
 2010 - Population: 1,919,000.
 2011
 Protests.
 Abdul Halim Al Kilani becomes mayor.
 2012
 Prophet Mohammad Museum opens.
 TAJ Lifestyle Center (TAJ Mall) opens
 2015 - 9 November: Amman shooting attack.
 2018 - June: Economic protests.

See also

 Amman Governorate
 Greater Amman Municipality
 List of universities in Amman
 Timeline of the Hashemite Kingdom of Jordan

Notes

References

Bibliography

Published in 19th century
 
 
 . 1898 ed.
 
 

Published in 20th century
 
 

Published in 21st century

External links

  (Includes depictions of Amman collected by the American Archaeological Expeditions to Syria, etc., 1899-1909)

Years in Jordan
 
Amman
amman
Amman